The Babakin Science and Research Space Centre is a division of the Lavochkin Design Bureau based in Khimki, Russia. It is managed by them on behalf of Roscosmos. It is named after Georgy N. Babakin, chief designer of the Lavochkin Association from 1965 to 1971.

Its task is to probe the space through unmanned lunar and planetary missions. The spacecraft of the Kosmos 1 mission was built at the centre.

See also 
 Titov Main Test and Space Systems Control Centre

References

External links
 Babakin Science & Research Space Center (archived)

Soviet and Russian space program locations
Space technology research institutes
Lavochkin
Companies based in Moscow Oblast
Research institutes in the Soviet Union